James Michael "Jake" O'Donnell (born January 25, 1937 in Philadelphia) is a former sports official who worked as a National Basketball Association (NBA) referee for 28 seasons from 1967 to 1995, and also as an umpire in Major League Baseball for four seasons from  to .  He is the only person to officiate All-Star games in both Major League Baseball and the NBA.

NBA career
As a referee, O'Donnell officiated in 2,134 NBA games (a record held until February 2006 that was broken by Dick Bavetta), 279 playoff games, and 40 NBA Finals games. O'Donnell was a respected official for his no-nonsense, flamboyant style.  O'Donnell was not inclined to be intimidated or swayed by the home crowds.  According to Harvey Pollack, a long-time statistician for the Philadelphia 76ers, O'Donnell was the most even-handed referee in regards to percentage of wins by road teams in games he officiated compared to other referees.  O'Donnell was also respected for making the correct call and admitting errors when they occurred.  He once took a group of reporters in a rental car to a local TV station to review the game tapes following a controversial finish to a 1981 NBA Playoffs game in Philadelphia that involved the 24-second shot clock and a complaint by then-Milwaukee Bucks head coach Don Nelson.

O'Donnell announced his retirement as an official in the NBA on December 7, 1995, the same day the league's referees agreed to return to work following a lockout to start the 1995–96 NBA season.

Clyde Drexler ejection
O'Donnell's final game of his officiating career was marred by a controversial ejection of the Houston Rockets' Clyde Drexler during the 1995 NBA Playoffs, which allegedly stemmed from a personal feud between the two at the time. In Game 1 of the second-round playoff matchup between the Rockets and Phoenix Suns, Drexler picked up two technical fouls, which resulted in an ejection, after arguing with O'Donnell over a questionable "clear path" foul against him while going for a loose ball with the Suns' Dan Majerle.  This incident occurred after O'Donnell refused to shake hands at a pregame meeting with Drexler before the opening tipoff, which was the history during the previous couple of years.  The Rockets complained to the league over O'Donnell's actions and sent a video tape to Commissioner David Stern showing the meeting of O'Donnell refusing to shake Drexler's hand. Elyse Lanier, the wife of Houston Mayor Bob Lanier, personally phoned Stern to complain about O'Donnell.

The league responded to the incident by not assigning O'Donnell to officiate any additional playoff games that year, including the 1995 NBA Finals, which ended a string of 23 consecutive appearances in the Finals.  The league also rescinded the standard $1,000 ejection fine to Drexler.  The NBA never formally announced the suspension of O'Donnell, but paid him for working the first three playoff rounds, although he did not work past the second round.  Both O'Donnell and the NBA have denied the impression that this incident led to O'Donnell being forced out of the league.  At the time, O'Donnell claimed there was no feud between him and Drexler, stating, "I just don't take any crap from anyone, and he couldn't handle that. If he thinks it was personal, fine, but it wasn't from my standpoint."  However a year later in an interview with ESPN  O'Donnell commented, "I wouldn't give Clyde Drexler much leeway because of the way he reacted with me all the time. I thought at times he would give cheap shots to people, and I just would not allow it."

MLB career
As an umpire, O'Donnell's first game in the American League was September 17, 1968 between the Washington Senators and Cleveland Indians.  O'Donnell was called up late in the 1968 season, along with former major league player and NBA referee Bill Kunkel, after two AL umpires, Al Salerno and Bill Valentine, were fired by league president Joe Cronin for attempting to organize a union among Junior Circuit umpires.

During his short career in the majors, he worked 489 regular season games, the 1971 American League Championship Series between the Baltimore Orioles and the Oakland Athletics, and as the second-base umpire in the 1971 All-Star Game at Tiger Stadium. This game was most notable for Reggie Jackson's home run which hit off the right-center field rooftop transformer. He was also the third-base umpire for Jim Palmer's no-hitter on August 13, 1969. O'Donnell resigned from the AL after the 1971 season to concentrate on his burgeoning basketball officiating career.

O'Donnell's final regular season baseball game saw him at second base when the Washington Senators were forced to forfeit their final game at Robert F. Kennedy Memorial Stadium to the New York Yankees on September 30, 1971. The Senators held a 7–5 lead with two outs in the ninth inning when unruly fans invaded the field, prompting crew chief Jim Honochick to declare the Yankees the victors by a 9–0 count. The Senators moved to Arlington, Texas prior to the 1972 season and became the Texas Rangers. Due to the timing of O'Donnell's resignation from the AL, he did not work an event in the Dallas-Fort Worth area until the Dallas Mavericks joined the NBA in October 1980. O'Donnell also did not work another event in the District of Columbia, since the NBA's Bullets were in Baltimore at the time of his resignation and moved to Landover, Maryland in 1973, where they played at the Capital Centre before moving to the MCI Center in downtown Washington in 1997.

Jim Evans, who was a fill-in for a handful of American League games in 1971, was named as O'Donnell's permanent replacement for the 1972 season. Evans went on to work nearly 28 seasons before he was forced out in 1999 by the failed mass resignation strategy of Major League Umpires Association President Richie Phillips, who coincidentally was a friend of O'Donnell's, as both lived in Philadelphia. Phillips was also the NBA Referee's Association President until he was forced out by Darell Garretson, with whom O'Donnell frequently clashed, in the 1980s.

See also

 List of Major League Baseball umpires

References

National Basketball Association referees
1939 births
Living people
Sportspeople from Philadelphia
Major League Baseball umpires